Lynn Sherr (born March 4, 1942) is an American broadcast journalist and author, best known as a correspondent for the ABC news magazine 20/20.

Life
Sherr was born in Philadelphia, Pennsylvania, and attended Lower Merion High School in Ardmore. She received a B.A. from Wellesley College.

She was a freelance host at WNET-TV in New York City, then staff. She worked for the Associated Press and WCBS-TV. In 1977, she was the guest host of the MacNeil–Lehrer Report while Robert MacNeil was absent, and has hosted a number of PBS specials. In 1983–85 she was a reporter/editor for Condé Nast. In 2008, she left the television network ABC after working with them for 31 years. She is the author of Outside the Box: A Memoir, published in September 2006, which chronicles her life on and off TV, including her husband's death from cancer as well as her own battle with colon cancer.

She received a 1994 George Foster Peabody Award along with producer Alan B. Goldberg for the "Hunger Inside" a 20/20 documentary about extreme anorexia.

Feminism
Sherr is a feminist. She has twice (in 1989 and 1992) been the recipient of the Planned Parenthood Federation of America's (PPFA) Margaret Sanger Award (known as the "Maggie"), which is awarded to journalists for "exceptional coverage of reproductive rights and health care issues" in the view of PPFA. She also hosted PPFA's Maggie Awards luncheon in 2010.

Sherr has rejected calls for a "new feminism" and remarked, "What's wrong with the old feminism?" She strongly criticized Sarah Palin for calling herself a feminist: "What, exactly, has she done legislatively for other women? What paths has she forged?"

Sherr was featured in the Jewish Women's Archive web feature Jewish Women and the Feminist Revolution.

Published works

 Susan B. Anthony Slept Here: A Guide to American Women's Landmarks (co-author, 1994)

References

External links
 ABC News 20/20 profile 
 
 The Giraffe Conservation Foundation where Lynn Sherr is a Founding Patron.

1942 births
American biographers
20th-century American Jews
American feminists
Jewish feminists
American television reporters and correspondents
Living people
Peabody Award winners
Writers from Philadelphia
Wellesley College alumni
Journalists from Pennsylvania
Lower Merion High School alumni
21st-century American Jews